Class E basic helix-loop-helix protein 40 is a protein that in humans is encoded by the BHLHE40 gene.

Function 

DEC1 encodes a basic helix-loop-helix protein expressed in various tissues.  Expression in the chondrocytes is responsive to the addition of Bt2cAMP.  Differentiated embryo chondrocyte expressed gene 1 is believed to be involved in the control of cell differentiation.

References

Further reading

External links 
 
 
 
 
 

Transcription factors